Bailando 2021 is the fifteenth season of Bailando por un Sueño which premiered as a segment on the program Showmatch on May 17, 2021, on the El Trece network following the permanent cancellation of the planned 2020 season. However, the competition will start a day later, on May 18. Marcelo Tinelli returned as host. In addition, the program will feature for the first time a digital host who will be Lizardo Ponce (also a contestant in this edition).

The season was also named as "La Academia", because participants must learn and show multiple artistic disciplines —singing, skating, acrobatics, imitation, acting— in addition to performing a dance presentation. There will be new challenges from different artistic manifestations.

A new format change was introduced for the rest of the season: In the duel, the couples will have to make a different presentation (it does not necessarily have to be dance, it can be another discipline).

What is new about this season is that the judges are going to have the power (in some rounds) to eliminate a couple —although this mechanism has been carried out in the previous season in the rounds of "Duels I" and "Duels II"—. Also on some occasions (in the event of a tie), María Laura "Lolo" Rossi and Eugenia López Frugoni, the choreographers chiefs, define the eliminated couple.

Cast
On May 4 was presented the official photo of the cast (celebrities, judges and presenter).

Couples 
Initially, 23 teams were confirmed. This season 5 couples made up of celebrities participate, they are: Ezequiel Cwirkaluk & Bárbara Silenzi; Florencia Vigna & Facundo Mazzei; Luciana Salazar & Jorge Moliniers; Pablo Prada & Lourdes Sánchez and Ulises Bueno & Rocío Pardo.

The team number 24 is made up of two celebrities: producer Pablo Prada and dancer Lourdes Sánchez (Prada's girlfriend). They were summoned in the first program by Tinelli.

Due to the low number of couples (15) at this time of year (in August), the production decided to add more couples to the show. On August 10, the new contestants were officially confirmed: Ariel Puchetta, Celeste Muriega (who participated in this edition as a replacement for Bárbara Silenzi), Lionel Ferro, Mariela Anchipi (who replaced Sofía Jiménez for 4 rounds) and Rodrigo Tapari. Nazarena Veléz was confirmed to join the show as a new addition in round 10; but for personal reasons she retired (before her debut).

On September 20, Nazareno Móttola (who was a substitute contestant this season) was confirmed to compete in the show.

On September 21, Agustín Barajas (Hernán Piquín's boyfriend) was confirmed to participate in the competition. In addition, a live casting was held to find the dance partner among the dancers on the La Academias staff: Estefanía Pais, Julia «Juja» Pérez and Loana «Loli» Ruiz were the pre-selected for the position; being latter selected by the judges as a professional from Barajas. 

In quotation marks («»), the nicknames.

 Choreographers 
Alphabetical order

 Judges 
The panel of judges will be made up of four personalities associated with the world of dance, theatre, acting, singing, modelling and television. Two of them return from the previous edition: de Brito and Ardohaín. Barón and Piquín joined the panel as a new judges. The two new judges have competed in previous editions.

Ángel de Brito (Journalist & TV and radio host)
Carolina «Pampita» Ardohaín (Model, TV host, actress & former dancer)
Jimena Barón (Actress & singer-songwriter) —she was a participant in seventh edition and thirteenth edition; in the latter finished in second place—
Hernán Piquín (Dancer) —he was the first two-time champion of the show, won seventh edition and eighth edition. It was also finalist in the ninth edition. In addition participated in the fourteenth edition even though, for personal and work reasons, he withdrew from the competition in the round 7—

After eight seasons, Marcelo Polino did not return this season as a judge.

 Scoring chart 

Italics numbers indicate the partial scores; without the secret vote
 indicate the lowest score for each style
 indicate the highest score for each style
"—" indicates the couple did not dance that round
"A": All couples are sent to duel

 

 Rounds 
Individual judges' scores in the charts below (given in parentheses) are listed in this order from left to right: Ángel de Brito, Carolina Ardohain, Guillermina Valdés, Jimena Barón, Hernán Piquín.

 Round 1: Double cube 
Individual judges' scores in the charts below (given in parentheses) are listed in this order from left to right: Carolina Ardohain, Jimena Barón, Guillermina Valdés, Hernán Piquín.

The couples will perform a choreography with one element: two cubes (where they will have to dance inside and on them). This dance will combine synchronization dance with acrobatics. The couples will have to use the two cubes, freely. But they have to comply with a fundamental rule: dance in sync, each one in each cube and without seeing each other, for a period of 15 seconds. In addition, the couple together with their coach are in charge of choosing the song and the images on the screens.

On May 10, it is confirmed that Ángel de Brito will be replaced in the first broadcasts of the program because he tested positive for COVID-19. the model and businesswoman Guillermina Valdés will be the substitute judge; while de Brito recovers. de Brito returned on June 27, for the duel and the elimination of the first round (Valdés was also a participant in this process; so there were 5 judges instead of 4).

In the duel of this round, there were 5 judges: Ángel de Brito joined and Guillermina Valdes occupied the role of guest judge. In this round, the choreographers chief was not considered for the definition of the eliminated couple (since it was impossible for there to be a tie between the judges). 
Running order

 indicate the lowest score 
 indicate the highest score 
 Sentenced Saved by the judges 
 Eliminated Round 2: "Perfect imitation" 
Individual judges' scores in the charts below (given in parentheses) are listed in this order from left to right: Ángel de Brito, Carolina Ardohain, Jimena Barón, Hernán Piquín.

The contestants must be characterized as a specific singer and perform one (or more) of their songs, imitating the original singer in question as best as possible, both in movements and voice. As the voices of the contestants imitating the singers were previously recorded, the judges must evaluate the lip sync (among other things).

The teams, if they wish, can add another professional dancer to accompany the performance.
Running order

 indicate the lowest score 
 indicate the highest score 

 Sentenced Saved by the judges 
 Eliminated Withdrew Round 3: Shuffle dance 
The couples will perform this dance with four guest dancers. 
Running order

 indicate the lowest score 
 indicate the highest score 

 Sentenced Saved by the judges Saved by the audience 
 Eliminated Round 4: Disco 
Running order

 indicate the lowest score 
 indicate the highest score 

 Sentenced Saved by the judges Eliminated Round 5: Ballroom samba 
Running order

 indicate the lowest score 
 indicate the highest score 

 Sentenced Saved by the judges 
 Saved by the audience 
 Eliminated Round 6: Reggaeton 

Running order

 indicate the lowest score 
 indicate the highest score 

 Sentenced Saved by the production Withdrew Round 7: "Singing" 
Individual judges' scores in the charts below (given in parentheses) are listed in this order from left to right: Ángel de Brito, Guillermina Valdés, Jimena Barón, Hernán Piquín.

The celebrities will have to sing in live one (or more) song(s). The professionals will not have the obligation to sing, but they can do it if they wish. They can also include dance in their performance.

In this round, Sofía Jiménez returned temporarily to sing, but she has not yet recovered from the injury to be able to dance. For this reason, she will be replaced again by Mariela Anchipi in the next round.

All couples will have a singing choreographer. In addition, in this round there will be a choreographer chief of singing: Sebastián Mazzoni.

From July 22 to August 2, Valdés returned to the judging panel but this time to replace Carolina Ardohain, who went on leave as she became a mother.
Running order

 indicate the lowest score 
 indicate the highest score 

 Sentenced Saved by the judges 
 Eliminated Round 8: "Superduel" 

"Superduel" method
 In this round, the 16 competing couples will face each other in individual duels (that is, one couple will face another) and those crosses will be defined by the average of the scores obtained in all the dances performed so far. 
 The duels will be conformed as follows:

 

 Each judge will choose one of two couples. The couple with the most votes will advance to the next round and the remaining couple will continue into the next match (in the event of a tie, the choreographers chiefs define). Until the last two couples remain, where the eliminated couple of this round will be defined. 
 The "Super duel" will have 4 stages:
 Top 16: In this round all the couples that are still in competition will dance; will present a choreography by cuarteto.
 Bottom 8: At this stage only the worst 8 couples from the Top 16 will be presented; will perform again their choreography of disco.
 Bottom 4: In this instance the worst 4 couples will remain (the losers of Bottom 8); they will have to dance again their choreography of ballroom samba.
 Bottom 2: This is the last stage of the  "Super duel" , where a couple will be eliminated. The two worst couples will have to dance a choreography of urban pop.

 Average score chart 
This table only counts dances scored on a 40-point scale.

 First duel: Cuarteto 
Running order

 Second duel: Disco 
For the first time in the history of the show, a choreographer (María Laura Cattalini) from another team (of Angela Leiva & Jonathan Lazarte), who are still in competition, will replace a celebrity (Viviana Saccone). This happens because the production needed to choose someone capable of learning the choreographies in a matter of hours.

Mar Tarrés will have to dance another choreography, because her former choreographer (Judith Kovalovsky) did not allow her to use the choreography put by her in the respective round.
Running order

 Third duel: Ballroom samba 
Running order

 Fourth duel: Urban pop 
For this duel, the couples will have the option to decide whether to choose the song that they danced in round 1 or in round 3. Although, they will have to perform a new choreography with the chosen song.

On July 30, this duel was unfinished because Mar Tarrés had health problems, therefore, could not dance; in the next transmission (August 2) the duel will be defined. On August 2, the production gave Mario Guerci & Soledad Bayona the opportunity to dance again; they refused.
Running order

Notes 

 Round 9: Pole dance 
On August 2, Ardohain returned to the judging table; Valdés will remain as fifth judge.
Running order

 indicate the lowest score 
 indicate the highest score 

 Sentenced Saved by the judges 
 Saved by the audience 
 Eliminated Round 10: Argentine cumbia 
Running order

 indicate the lowest score 
 indicate the highest score 

 Sentenced Saved by the judges 
 Eliminated Round 11: Trio salsa 
The couples danced trio salsa involving another celebrity or a close acquaintance (friend or family member).
Running order

 indicate the lowest score 
 indicate the highest score 

 Sentenced Saved by the judges 
 Saved by the audience 
 Eliminated Withdrew Round 12: "One (song) we all know" 

The couples will have to dance to a popular song, chosen by them (together with their choreographer). The judges evaluate whether or not the danced song is a musical hit (in addition to the choreography).

On September 7 and 8, Carolina Ardohain was absent for personal reasons. In her place, the singer (and current contestant of this edition) Karina Tejeda, was as a guest judge. It is the second time in the history of the show that a regular participant also holds an evaluator position (the first case was with Lourdes Sánchez at Bailando 2018, where she was a member of the BAR and, at the same time, the celebrity partner of Diego Ramos). 
 
In the duel, a guest judge was present: Federico Bal, who replaces Piquín. The latter was absent due to work.
Running order

 indicate the lowest score 
 indicate the highest score 

 Sentenced Saved by the judges 
 Eliminated Round 13: "Judges' team-up challenge" 
The couples performed a dance and song chosen by one the judges.

On September 10, Hernán Piquín was absent from the judges' stand for work reasons. In his place was the actor, radio presenter, producer, theater director and former participant Federico Bal. Bal returned on September 15, this time, to replace Ángel de Brito (who was not present for personal reasons). On September 17, he returned to take the place of Piquín.

On September 17, in addition to Piquín's absence, Guillermina Valdés also did not attend the program due to another work commitment. In her place was the dancer, TV host, former participant and former BAR judge Lourdes Sanchez.
Running order

 indicate the lowest score 
 indicate the highest score 

 Sentenced Saved by the judges 
 Saved by the audience 
 Eliminated Round 14: "Superduel II" 

"Superduel II" method
 In this round, the 15 competing couples will face each other in individual duels (that is, one couple will face another) and those crosses will be defined by the average of the scores obtained in all the dances performed so far. As the number of competing couples is odd, there was a duel of three couples. 
 The duels will be conformed as follows:

 

 Each judge will choose one (or two) of two (or three) couples. The couple with the most votes will advance to the next round and the remaining couple will continue into the next match. Until the last three couples remain, where the eliminated couple of this round will be defined. 
 The "Superduel" will have 3 stages:
 Top 15: In this round all the couples that are still in competition will dance; will present a choreography by adagio.
 Bottom 7: At this stage only the worst 7 couples from the Top 15 will be presented; will perform again their choreography of argentine cumbia.
 Bottom 3: This is the last stage of the "Superduel", where a couple will be eliminated. The three worst couples will have to dance a choreography of salsa.

 Average score chart 
This table only counts dances scored on a 40 and 50-point scale.

 First duel: Adagio 
Running order

Second duel (Argentine cumbia) 
Third duel (Salsa)

On September 24, during the second duel, Mazzei suffered an injury while performing the choreography, for this reason they could not finish dancing it; and they were sent directly to the third duel, where Mazzei would be replaced.
Celeste Muriega and Maximiliano Diorio, the couple facing off against Vigna and Mazzei, were automatically saved by the production. Subsequently, face-off 9 was held, where Agustín Sierra & Fiorella Giménez and Karina Tejeda & Rafael Muñiz advanced to the next round by decision of the judges and Rodrigo Tapari & Sol Beatriz were sentenced to face-off 11. Due to lack of time, it was pending the face-off 9 (Lionel Ferro & Camila Lonigro versus Lizardo Ponce & Josefina Oriozabala) and the execution of the third duel (the last face-off, number 11).

On September 27, Florencia Vigna and Facundo Mazzei announced their retirement from the competition. Therefore, the production decided to save the couples that were still in the second or third duel (Lionel Ferro & Camila Lonigro, Lizardo Ponce & Josefina Oriozabala and Rodrigo Tapari & Sol Beatriz)
Notes
On September 23 and 24, Jimena Barón was absent from the judges' stand for work reasons. In his place was Lourdes Sánchez.

 Round 15: "Dancing with guest singers" 
In this round, the couples had the special participation of a professional singer.

It is not obligation that both the celebrity and the professional sing, they still have the possibility to perform it. The couples can choose whether to sing or dance or both. The special guest has to sing, but can also dance.

The singing must be performed live and they can sing more than one song, if they wish.
Running order

{|class="wikitable collapsible collapsed" style="text-align: align; width: 100%;"
|-
! colspan="11" style="with: 100%;" align="center" | The duel
|-
! width=85|Date 
! width=180|Couple
! width=240|Act
! width=120|Result
|-
|rowspan="4"|
|bgcolor="lightgreen"|Nazareno Móttola & Micaela Grimoldi
|They performed a danced routine combining jazz and pasodoble, inspired by the film Pirates of the Caribbean. They also included acting moments.
Song «He's a Pirate» 
|2nd couple saved
|-
|bgcolor="lightgreen"|José María Peña & Florencia Díaz
|His presentation was titled as: "We went back to the 80s" where performed a danced routine combining jazz and disco. 
Song «Groove Is in the Heart» 
|1st couple saved
|-
|bgcolor="lightgreen"|Lizardo Ponce & Josefina Oriozabala
|His presentation was titled as: "Challenge achieved" where three different dance thematics were proposed. They had the participation of six dancers from the ''La Academias sttaf, the choreographers chiefs and Martín Salwe as voice-over. 
Song Mix: «¿Qué más pues?» «Wannabe» «Livin' la vida loca» 
|Bottom two (Last to be called safe)
|-
|bgcolor="orange"|Lionel Ferro & Camila Lonigro
|They performed a street dance. In addition, Ferro performed lip sync (the singing voice were previously recorded) in Spanish. They were accompanied by two invited dancers (Facundo Insúa —Julieta Puente's former professional— and Maité Demarchi).
Song «Yummy» 
|Eliminated
|-
! style="background:black" colspan="4" |
|-
|colspan="4"|
Judges' votes to save (Bottom two'')
de Brito: Lionel Ferro & Camila Lonigro
Ardohain: Lizardo Ponce & Josefina Oriozabala
Valdés: Lizardo Ponce & Josefina Oriozabala
Barón: Lizardo Ponce & Josefina Oriozabala
Piquín: Lizardo Ponce & Josefina Oriozabala
Result 
 Lionel Ferro & Camila Lonigro (1 vote)
 Lizardo Ponce & Josefina Oriozabala (4 votes) 
|}
 indicate the lowest score 
 indicate the highest score 

 Sentenced
 Saved by the judges 
 Eliminated
 Withdrew

Round 16: "Dancing with dancers children" 
In this round, the couples will be accompanied by a dancer child.

Running order

 indicate the lowest score 
 indicate the highest score 

 Sentenced
 Saved by the judges 
 Saved by the audience
 Eliminated
 Withdrew

Round 17: Tributes 
Running order

 indicate the lowest score 
 indicate the highest score 

 Sentenced
 Saved by the judges 
 Eliminated
 Withdrew

Round 18: Rock and roll 
On November 2 to November 5, Jimena Barón did not attend the program due to personal reasons. In her place was the dancer, TV host, former participant and former BAR judge Lourdes Sánchez.

Running order

 indicate the lowest score 
 indicate the highest score 

 Sentenced
 Saved by the judges 
 Saved by the audience
 Eliminated

Round 19: Merengue 
On November 9, Carolina Ardohaín did not attend the program due to another work commitment. In her place was the dancer, TV host, former participant and former BAR judge Lourdes Sánchez.

Running order

 indicate the lowest score 
 indicate the highest score 

 Sentenced
 Saved by the judges 
 Eliminated

Round 20: "Musical theatre" 
In this round there will be double elimination.

Running order

 indicate the lowest score 
 indicate the highest score 

 Sentenced
 Saved by the judges
 Saved by the audience 
 Eliminated

Round 21: Urban dance 
Running order

 indicate the lowest score 
 indicate the highest score 

 Sentenced
 Saved by the judges
 Saved by the audience 
 Eliminated

Round 22: Film Music 
Running order

 indicate the lowest score 
 indicate the highest score 

 Sentenced
 Saved by the judges
 Saved by the audience 
 Eliminated

Semifinals

1st Semi-final 

Notes
 : The point is for the couple.
 : The point is not for the couple.

Result
      Finalists: Noelia Marzol & Jonathan Lazarte
      Semifinalist: Celeste Muriega & Maximiliano Diorio

2nd Semifinal 

Notes
 : The point is for the couple.
 : The point is not for the couple.

Result
      Finalists: Agustín Sierra & Fiorella Giménez 
      Semifinalist: Candela Ruggeri & Nicolás Fleitas

Final 
 Cumbia singer L-Gante, joined the state as a guest judge.

Notes
 : The point is for the couple.
 : The point is not for the couple.

Result:
      Winners: Noelia Marzol & Jonathan Lazarte
      Runner-up: Agustín Sierra & Fiorella Giménez

References

External links

Argentina
Argentine variety television shows
2021 Argentine television seasons
Television series impacted by the COVID-19 pandemic